Mount Kendang is a stratovolcano located in the border between Kertasari Subdistrict, Bandung Regency and Pasirwangi Subdistrict, Garut Regency, West Java, Indonesia. It contains four fumarole fields including Kawah Manuk, a broad, 2.75 km wide crater. Sulfur sublimation, mud pots and hot springs are found in the volcano.

See also 

 List of volcanoes in Indonesia

References 

Kendang
Kendang